Stephen Andrew Panos (Greek: Στιβ Πάνος; born February 4, 1988) is a Greek-American former professional basketball player. At a height of 2.06 m (6'9") tall, he played at the power forward and center positions.

College career
After playing high school basketball at Highland High School, in Salt Lake City, Utah, Panos played college basketball at Weber State, from 2006 to 2010.

Professional career
Panos began his pro career with the Greek League club Kolossos in 2010. He moved to the Greek club Kavala in 2012. He joined the Greek club Trikala Aries in 2013. In 2014 he resigned with Trikala for a 1 year contract

The Basketball Tournament
In the summers of 2015 and 2017, Panos played in The Basketball Tournament, on ESPN, for The Wasatch Front (Weber State Alumni). He competed for the $2 million prize in 2017, and for The Wasatch Front, he scored 6 points in their first round loss to Team Challenge ALS, by a score of 97–81.

References

External links
Official Twitter Account
Eurobasket.com Profile
Draftexpress.com Profile
Greek Basket League Profile 
Balkan League Profile
Weber State College Profile
ESPN College Stats

1988 births
Living people
American men's basketball players
American people of Greek descent
Aries Trikala B.C. players
Basketball players from Salt Lake City
Centers (basketball)
Greek men's basketball players
Kavala B.C. players
Kolossos Rodou B.C. players
Power forwards (basketball)
Promitheas Patras B.C. players
Weber State Wildcats men's basketball players